Lenôtre, Le Nôtre or LeNotre is a French family name, le nôtre means ours. It may refer to:

Alain LeNôtre, a pastry chef
André Le Nôtre, (1613–1700) principal gardener of King Louis XIV of France
Lac-Lenôtre, Quebec, unorganized territory in the Outaouais region of Quebec, Canada